is a well known Japanese master of karate and kobudo (traditional weaponry). He was Pat Morita's martial arts stunt double in the first, third and fourth Karate Kid films (and the inspiration for "Mr. Miyagi"). Demura holds the rank of 9th dan in Shitō-ryū karate.

Early life
Demura was born on September 15, 1938, in Yokohama, Japan. At the age of 9 (1947/48), he began training in karate and kendo under an instructor named Asano. At the age of 12 (1950/51) he started training under Ryusho Sakagami in Itosu-kai karate. Demura received his 1st dan black belt in 1956, and won the East Japan Championships in 1957. In 1959, he began training in kobudo, a style of Okinawan weapons training, under the direction of Taira Shinken. In 1963, he "came to 
know the Koga Ryu Ninjutsu Soke, Seiko Fujita- a 14th Generation Koga Ryu Ninja - personally" (quote attributed to Fumio Demura himself). Demura met martial arts scholar Donn Draeger, who introduced him to Dan Ivan, who would eventually bring him to the United States of America as a karate instructor.

Career
In 1965, Demura came to the United States, representing the Japan Karate-do Itosu-kai. From his base in southern California, he became well known for his karate and kobudo skills. In 1971, he was ranked 5th dan, and he remained at that rank until at least 1982. Through the 1970s and 1980s, Demura wrote several martial arts books, including: Shito-Ryu Karate (1971), Advanced nunchaku (1976, co-authored), Tonfa: Karate weapon of self-defense (1982), Nunchaku: Karate weapon of self-defense (1986), Bo: Karate weapon of self-defense (1987), and Sai: Karate weapon of self-defense (1987).

In 1986, Demura was promoted to 7th dan in Shito-ryū karate. In 2001, he was expelled from the Itosu-kai, and became the Director of Shito-ryū Karate-do Genbu-kai. In 2005, he was promoted to 9th dan. He currently resides in Santa Ana, California.

In October 2010, Demura performed for the United States Martial Arts Festival, hosted by Koyamada International Foundation (KIF) at the Redondo Beach Performing Arts Center in Redondo Beach, California.

Karate Kid films
In the 1980s, Demura became involved in the Karate Kid series of films. He was the stunt double for Pat Morita, who played Mr. Miyagi. The Karate Kid screenwriter Robert Mark Kamen stated that Mr. Miyagi was named after Chōjun Miyagi, the founder of the Goju-ryu karate style, and that Fumio Demura was the inspiration for the character.

Demura has appeared in several films and documentaries, including: The Warrior within (1976), The Island of Dr. Moreau (1977), The Karate Kid (1984), The Karate Kid Part III (1989), Shootfighter: Fight to the death (1992), Rising Sun (1993), The Next Karate Kid (1994), Masters of the martial arts (1998, presented by Wesley Snipes), Mystic origins of the martial arts (1998), Modern warriors (2002), XMA: Xtreme Martial Arts (2003), and Ninja (2009). Demura is the subject of the 2015 documentary "The Real Miyagi".

References

External links
 
 

 

Living people
1938 births
American stunt performers
Japanese emigrants to the United States
Japanese male karateka
Karate coaches
Shitō-ryū practitioners
Martial arts writers
Sportspeople from Santa Ana, California
Sportspeople from Yokohama
American sportspeople of Japanese descent